Qaraağac is a village in the Jabrayil Rayon of Azerbaijan.

References

Populated places in Jabrayil District